Boothbay Harbor is a town in Lincoln County, Maine, United States. The population was 2,027 at the 2020 census. It includes the villages of Bayville, Sprucewold, and West Boothbay Harbor. During summer months, the entire Boothbay Harbor region is a popular yachting and tourist destination. The ZIP Code is 04538, and the community is served by the 633 telephone exchange in area code 207.

History

The Abenaki people that lived in the region called it Winnegance. The first European presence in the region was an English fishing outpost called Cape Newagen in 1623. A Englishman by the name of Henry Curtis purchased the right to settle Winnegance from the Abenaki Sachem Mowhotiwormet in 1666. However, the English were driven from their settlements by the Abenaki in 1676 during King Philip's War in 1676. The colonists returned after the war ended. In 1689 during King William's War, they were driven out again. Winnegance was abandoned entirely, and remained a desolate waste for 40 years.

In 1730, Colonel David Dunbar, the superintendent and governor of the Territory of Sagadahock, laid out a new town, named Townsend after Viscount Townshend. Despite predations during the French and Indian Wars, and robberies during the Revolutionary War by marauding British sailors, the settlement was successful, not least because of its large, deep and protected harbor. During the Penobscot Expedition, in 1779 Townsend became a rendezvous point for the American naval fleet prior to its disastrous encounter with the British at Castine.

Renamed Boothbay in 1842, the harbor continued to develop as a fishing center. In bad weather, it could hold at a time between 400 and 500 vessels, often Friendship Sloops, seeking shelter. By 1881, it had a fishery and fish oil company, an ice company, two marine railways, a fertilizer manufacturer, and a factory for canning lobsters.  On February 16, 1889, the community was set off from Boothbay and incorporated as the town of Boothbay Harbor. Frank L. Sample shipyard at Boothbay Harbor built minesweepers for the United States Navy during World War II and into the 1950s. Some location filming for the 1956 movie version of Rodgers and Hammerstein's Carousel, notably the "June Is Bustin' Out All Over" sequence, was done there. Each summer, Boothbay Harbor draws crowds of tourists. Attractions include the state aquarium, art galleries, restaurants, boat tours to coastal islands and whale watching.

Geography

The town is in southern Lincoln County, at the south end of a peninsula in the Gulf of Maine, part of the Atlantic Ocean. It is bordered to the west by the tidal Sheepscot River and to the east by Linekin Bay. The town center sits at the north end of Boothbay Harbor, which joins Linekin Bay to the south, past Spruce Point. Townsend Gut, to the southwest, separates the town of Boothbay Harbor from Southport Island. The town is bordered to the north and east by the town of Boothbay, to the south by the town of Southport, and to the west, across the Sheepscot River, by the towns of Westport and Georgetown. The island community of Isle of Springs is in the western part of the town, and West Boothbay Harbor is in the west-central part of the town. Bayville is next to the eastern border of the town, close to East Boothbay.

The town is crossed by state routes 27 and 96. Route 27 leads south into Southport and north  to Wiscasset.

Climate

Demographics

2010 census

As of the census of 2010, there were 2,165 people, 1,084 households, and 550 families residing in the town. The racial makeup of the town was 97.1% White, 0.6% African American or Black, 0.3% Native American, 0.8% Asian, 0.1% from other races, and 1.2% from two or more races. Latino of any race were 0.7% of the population.

There were 1,084 households, of which 14.9% had children under the age of 18 living with them, 40.9% were married couples living together, 7.3% had a female householder with no husband present, 2.6% had a male householder with no wife present, and 49.3% were non-families. 41.8% of all households were made up of individuals, and 22.6% had someone living alone who was 65 years of age or older. The average household size was 1.90 and the average family size was 2.52.

The median age in the town was 55.8 years. 11.6% of residents were under the age of 18; 5.4% were between the ages of 18 and 24; 16.6% were from 25 to 44; 33.3% were from 45 to 64; and 33.2% were 65 years of age or older. The gender makeup of the town was 45.5% male and 54.5% female.

2000 census

As of the census of 2000, there were 2,334 people, 1,097 households, and 627 families residing in the town. The racial makeup of the town was 97.9% White, 0.2% Black or African American, 0.30% Native American, 0.73% Asian, 0.34% from other races, and 0.56% from two or more races. Hispanic or Latino of any race were 0.90% of the population.

There were 1,097 households, out of which 21.9% had children under the age of 18 living with them, 46.4% were married couples living together, 8.4% had a female householder with no husband present, and 42.8% were non-families. 36.6% of all households were made up of individuals, and 18.4% had someone living alone who was 65 years of age or older.  The average household size was 2.05 and the average family size was 2.67.

In the town, the population was spread out, with 17.4% under the age of 18, 5.4% from 18 to 24, 22.9% from 25 to 44, 28.3% from 45 to 64, and 26.0% who were 65 years of age or older.  The median age was 48 years. For every 100 females, there were 84.2 males.  For every 100 females age 18 and over, there were 81.9 males.

The median income for a household in the town was $35,000, and the median income for a family was $45,000. Males had a median income of $30,000 versus $21,000 for females. The per capita income for the town was $21,146.  About 5.9% of families and 10.7% of the population were below the poverty line, including 16.7% of those under age 18 and 8.7% of those age 65 or over.

Media

The local newspaper for the Boothbay Region is the Boothbay Register. The Lincoln County News also circulates in Boothbay Harbor. The Portland Press Herald - Maine Sunday Telegram provides daily newspaper coverage.

Sites of interest 

 Auld-McCobb House
 Bayville
 Boothbay Harbor Memorial Library
 Boothbay Region High School
 Opera House at Boothbay Harbor
 Sprucewold Lodge
 West Boothbay Harbor

Notable people 

 Nancy Hemenway Barton, artist
 Arthur Bradford, writer and filmmaker
 Lansing Campbell, illustrator
 Charles H. Chapman, jazz musician
 Mabel Conkling, sculptor
 Ralph Fuller, cartoonist
 Raymond A. Hare, American diplomat
 Elle Logan, rower
 Terry Morrison, politician
 Anning Smith Prall, politician
 George Lincoln Rockwell, neo-Nazi politician
 Tim Sample, humorist
 Stanley R. Tupper, politician
 Michael van der Veen, attorney
 Arthur Valpey, American football player and coach
 Clarence Wilkinson, politician
 Jay Zeamer Jr., US Army Air Forces pilot and Medal of Honor recipient

References

Further reading

 History of Boothbay, Southport and Boothbay Harbor, Maine, 1623–1905. By Francis Byron Greene. Published 1906. Full image at Google Books.

External links

 Town of Boothbay Harbor official website
 Boothbay Register 
 Boothbay Harbor Memorial Library
 Boothbay Harbor Region Chamber of Commerce
 Boothbay Harbor Webcams

 
Towns in Lincoln County, Maine
Populated coastal places in Maine
1730 establishments in Massachusetts